The 2019–20 UTSA Roadrunners men's basketball team represent the University of Texas at San Antonio in the 2019–20 NCAA Division I men's basketball season. The Roadrunners, led by 4th-year head coach Steve Henson, play their home games at the Convocation Center in San Antonio, Texas as members of Conference USA.

Previous season
The Roadrunners finished the 2018–19 season 17–15 overall, 11–7 in C-USA play to finish in three-way tie for 2nd place. In the C-USA tournament, they were defeated by UAB in the quarterfinals.

Roster

Schedule and results

|-
!colspan=12 style=| Exhibition

|-
!colspan=12 style=| Non-conference regular season

|-
!colspan=12 style=| Conference USA regular season

|-
!colspan=9 style=| Conference USA tournament
|-

|-

Source

References

UTSA Roadrunners men's basketball seasons
UTSA Roadrunners
UTSA Roadrunners men's basketball
UTSA Roadrunners men's basketball